General elections were held in the Faroe Islands on 22 January 1924. The result was a victory for the Union Party, which won 13 of the 23 seats in the Løgting.

Results

References

Elections in the Faroe Islands
Faroe Islands
1924 in the Faroe Islands
January 1924 events
Election and referendum articles with incomplete results